WOKA (1310 AM) is a radio station broadcasting a gospel format. It is licensed to Douglas, Georgia, United States. The station is currently owned by Coffee County Broadcasters, Inc. and features programming from Fox News Radio.

References

External links

OKA
Radio stations established in 1989